The Welin breech block was a revolutionary stepped, interrupted thread design for locking artillery breeches, invented by Axel Welin in 1889 or 1890. Shortly after, Vickers acquired the British patents.  Welin breech blocks provide obturation for artillery pieces which use separate loading bagged charges and projectiles.  In this system the projectile is loaded first and then followed by cloth bags of propellant.

Design

The breech block screw incorporates multiple threaded "steppings" of progressively larger radius and a gap step occupying each circular section.  A three step breech block screw's circular area would nominally be divided into quarters, with each quarter containing three threaded sections of progressively increasing height and a gap step for insertion.

Each step engages with its matching thread cut in the gun breech when inserted and rotated. A gap in the thread steps was still necessary for the insertion of the largest step before rotation, so the area of the breech secured by threads in the block is:

This was a major improvement on previous, non-stepped designs such as the de Bange system.  The breech loader [of the] de Bange system uses a single thread step and can only engage half of the block's circumferential threads with the breech, necessitating a long screw to achieve a strong lock.  Efficiency is gained with multiple thread step heights on an interrupted screw because the smaller thread steps may be inserted into the breech along the radial vector of any larger step, whereas a single thread step interrupted screw cannot be inserted where any threads of the breech lay in the radial vector as any threads of the screw. Thread lock area is directly related to the munitions strength which may be safely fired, and thus large munitions with single step screw breeches needed unreasonably long breech screws.  These in turn required more time and much greater room to extract and move aside to gain access the gun's chamber to clean and reload it.    The engagement of threads around much more of the circumference of the Welin block allowed it to be shorter for the same total engagement area and strength, it required less than 90 degree rotation to lock the threads, making operation faster than previous designs and possible in much tighter space. It was also simpler and more secure.

Though the US Navy was offered the design a year or two after its invention, they declined and the American Bethlehem Steel spent the next five years in trying to circumvent Welin's patent, before having to buy it through Vickers.

See also
 Rifled breech loader

Notes and references

External links

 YouTube video showing Welin breech mechanism
 Royal New Zealand Artillery Association, Breech Mechanisms

Artillery components
Firearm actions